On 11 July 2022, Ukrainian forces launched a missile attack on the Russian-occupied city of Nova Kakhovka during the 2022 Russian invasion of Ukraine. Russia said that Ukraine used HIMARS missiles for the operation, having recently acquired them from the United States.

Events
Targets in the city were hit with large explosions, destroying an ammunitions depot. Videos showed an "immense fireball" rising out of the target.

Ukraine claimed that 52 Russian soldiers were killed, and that 12 officers died, including 22nd Army Corps Major General Artem Nasbulin. The Southern Military command of the Ukrainian Armed Forces said that "Based on the results of our rocket and artillery units, the enemy lost 52 soldiers, an Msta-B howitzer, a mortar, and seven armoured and other vehicles, as well as an ammunition depot in Nova Kakhovka."

Russian officials and state news agencies said that at least seven people had been killed and around 70 wounded, including civilians, and that widespread civilian properties, including a market, a pharmacy and church, warehouses, and houses had been damaged. A pro-Russian official in the governing Kakhovka District military-civilian administration said that several people were still trapped under the buildings' ruins. These claims have not yet been independently verified. Ukrainian spokesman Serhiy Khlan said that reports that the attack had damaged hospitals and residential areas were part of Russian propaganda and that many civilians in the town were happy at the idea of the Ukrainian forces being closer to the city.

See also 
 2022 Ukraine summer counteroffensive

References 

Attacks on buildings and structures in 2022
Attacks on buildings and structures in Ukraine
Southern Ukraine campaign
Airstrikes during the 2022 Russian invasion of Ukraine
Attack
July 2022 events in Ukraine
History of Kherson Oblast